Forcible entry is "the unlawful taking of possession of real property by force or threats of force or unlawful entry into or onto another's property, especially when accompanied by force". The term is also sometimes used for entry by military, police, or emergency personnel, also called breaching. For the fire service, forcible entry is defined by the International Fire Service Training Association (IFSTA) as:

Breaching doorways can be differentiated as "through the lock" or "through the door" depending on the techniques used.

England and Wales
Forcible entry was a common law offence in England and Wales, but was abolished, along with forcible detainer, by the Criminal Law Act 1977. It was replaced with a new offence of "using violence to secure entry" under section 6 of that Act.

Formerly the Forcible Entry Act 1381, chapter 2 of 15 Ric 2 (1391), the Forcible Entry Act 1429, the Forcible Entry Act 1588 and the Forcible Entry Act 1623 (repealed).

Judge Donaldson considered the question of forcible entry in the UK, in Swales v. Cox (1981):

See also
For other crimes related to forcible entry, see:
 Breaking and entering
 Trespass
 Home invasion
 Vandalism

For methods used by military, police, and emergency services to enter buildings, see:
 Door breaching

References

Crimes
Firefighting
Law enforcement techniques
Common law offences in England and Wales